Shanta Gold Limited is a gold mining company, registered in Guernsey in the Channel Islands but which operates in Tanzania. The company is listed on AIM on the London Stock Exchange (symbol: LON:SHG) and had a market capitalisation of £63.5M as of 18 September 2013. The Tanzanian offices are in Dar Es Salaam. Its bankers are UBS.

Shanta Gold is incorporated in Guernsey and maintains an office in Saint Peter Port. Shanta's most important project is New Luika Gold Mine, in the Lupa Gold Field of south western Tanzania, which saw its first gold pour in August 2012. The company's mines are all currently in Tanzania but projects elsewhere in East Africa are envisaged. Shanta sub-contracts all aspects of the mining process in order to shorten the time taken for a new mine to become productive.

Production statistics

Ownership
The following are the major investors that own more than 3% of the companys shareholdings:

References

External links
Official Website
Gold & Silver Trading
Gold & Diamond Jewellery

Gold mining companies
Companies of Guernsey
Mining in Tanzania
Companies listed on the Alternative Investment Market